The Russian State Archive of Socio-Political History (RGASPI) is a large Russian state archive based in Moscow, which holds pre-1952 archives of the Communist Party of the Soviet Union (CPSU). It is managed by Rosarkhiv. It was established in 1999 as merger of two other archives, the Russian Centre for the Preservation and Study of Documents of Most Recent History (RTsKhIDNI) and the Centre for the Preservation of Documents of Youth Organizations. Post-1952 archives of the CPSU are collected in the Russian State Archive of Contemporary History.

The archives include many of the personal papers of major Communist and Soviet leaders, including Nikolai Bukharin, Felix Dzerzhinsky, Lazar Kaganovich, Mikhail Kalinin, Lev Kamenev, Sergei Kirov, Georgy Malenkov, Anastas Mikoyan, V. M. Molotov, Georgi Plekhanov, Joseph Stalin, Leon Trotsky, and Grigory Zinoviev.

See also
 Marx-Engels-Lenin Institute
 Venona project

References

External links
  
 About RGASPI

1999 establishments in Russia
Archives in Russia
State archives
Organizations based in Moscow
Organizations established in 1999